Francesco Bracci (5 November 1879 – 24 March 1967) was an Italian cardinal of the Roman Catholic Church. He served as secretary of the Sacred Congregation for the Discipline of the Sacraments in the Roman Curia from 1935 to 1958, and was elevated to the cardinalate in 1958.

Biography
Born in Vignanello, Francesco Bracci studied at the seminary in Civita Castellana and the University of Rome. He was ordained to the priesthood on 6 June 1903 and finished his studies in 1906. He then served as a professor and the rector of the seminary, canon of the cathedral chapter, and diocesan chancellor in Civita Castellana.

Bracci entered the Roman Curia in 1914, as a lawyer to the Roman Rota, of which he was made auditor on 29 December 1934. Before becoming a referendary prelate of the Apostolic Signatura on 23 January 1926, he was raised to the rank of privy chamberlain of his holiness on 15 November 1919 and later domestic prelate of his holiness on 18 September 1922. On 30 December 1935, Bracci was named secretary of the Sacred Congregation for the Discipline of the Sacraments. As secretary, he served as the second-highest official of that dicastery, successively under Cardinals Domenico Jorio and Benedetto Aloisi Masella.

Pope John XXIII created him Cardinal Deacon of San Cesareo in Palatio in the consistory of 15 December 1958. Bracci, aged 79, was the oldest man to be elevated to the College of Cardinals in that ceremony. He resigned as secretary of Discipline of the Sacraments three days later, on 18 December.

On 5 April 1962 Bracci was appointed Titular Archbishop of Idassa by John XXIII. He received his episcopal consecration on the following 19 April from Pope John, with Cardinals Giuseppe Pizzardo and Aloisi Masella serving as co-consecrators, in the Lateran Basilica. The cardinal resigned as titular archbishop shortly afterwards, on 20 April, and attended the Second Vatican Council from 1962 to 1965. Called "the man who never laughs", Bracci was one of the cardinal electors in the 1963 papal conclave that elected Pope Paul VI.

He died in Rome at age 87, and is buried in the collegiate church of Vignanello.

References

External links
Catholic-Hierarchy 
Cardinals of the Holy Roman Church

1879 births
1967 deaths
20th-century Italian cardinals
Participants in the Second Vatican Council
Cardinals created by Pope John XXIII